Govt. Zirtiri Residential Science College is  the only institution that offers purely science education in the State of Mizoram. It is graded A by NAAC  and has  students 911 currently studying in the college.

Location

Zirtiri Residential Science College  is located in Ramthar Veng, Aizawl the  capital city of Mizoram. A new Campus has been constructed in Durtlang locality. The nearest airport is Lengpui Airport.

History

Zirtiri Residential Science College was started by Pi Lalziki in 1980.  It was initially recognized by UGC under Section 2(f) & Section 12 B in 1998. It initially functioned as a Women's College till 1985, it was further upgraded to a Co-ed Science College in 2000.  The existing Home Science Department of Zirtiri Women's College was amalgamated with the Science faculties from other Government Colleges of the State. It became a co-educational institute and has occupied the status of being the only Science College in Mizoram and the only College in the State to offer the study of Home Science. The College has been accredited with a A Grade (CGPA 3.09) by NAAC in the third accreditation cycle in 2022.

It is currently affiliated to Mizoram University.

Departments

Department of English
Department of Physics.
Department of Chemistry
Department of Mathematics
Department of Botany
Department of Zoology
Department of Bio-Chemistry
Department of Electronics
Department of Home Science
Department of Computer Sciences
Department of Geology

References

External links
 

Universities and colleges in Mizoram
Colleges affiliated to Mizoram University
Education in Aizawl
Science colleges in India